Suillellus pictiformis is a species of bolete fungus found in North America. It was originally described by American mycologist William Alphonso Murrill in 1943.

References

External links

pictiformis
Fungi described in 1943
Fungi of North America
Taxa named by William Alphonso Murrill